This article lists forms of government and political systems, according to a series of different ways of categorizing them. The systems listed are not mutually exclusive, and often have overlapping definitions.

According to Yale professor Juan José Linz there are three main types of political systems today: democracies, 
totalitarian regimes and, sitting between these two, authoritarian regimes with hybrid regimes. Another modern classification system includes monarchies as a standalone entity or as a hybrid system of the main three. Scholars generally refer to a dictatorship as either a form of authoritarianism or  totalitarianism.

The ancient Greek philosopher Plato discusses in the Republic five types of regimes: aristocracy, timocracy, oligarchy, democracy, and tyranny.

Basic form of governments

Index of Forms of Government.

Forms of government by regional control 



Forms of government by power source

Types of democracy

Types of oligarchy 
Oligarchies are societies controlled and organised by a small class of privileged people, with no intervention from the most part of society; this small elite is defined as sharing some common trait.

De jure democratic governments with a de facto oligarchy are ruled by a small group of segregated, powerful or influential people who usually share similar interests or family relations. These people may spread power and elect candidates equally or not equally. An oligarchy is different from a true democracy because very few people are given the chance to change things. An oligarchy does not have to be hereditary or monarchic. An oligarchy does not have one clear ruler but several rulers.

Some historical examples of oligarchy are the Roman Republic, in which only males of the nobility could run for office and only wealthy males could vote, and the Athenian democracy, which used sortition to elect candidates, almost always male, Greek, educated citizens holding a minimum of land, wealth and status. Some critics of capitalism and/or representative democracy think of the United States and the United Kingdom as oligarchies.

Note: These categories are not exclusive.

Types of autocracy 
Autocracies are ruled by a single entity with absolute power, whose decisions are subject to neither external legal restraints nor regular mechanisms of popular control (except perhaps for implicit threat). That entity may be an individual, as in a dictatorship or it may be a group, as in a one-party state. The word despotism means to "rule in the fashion of despots" and is often used to describe autocracy.

Historical examples of autocracy include the Roman Empire, North Korea, the Islamic Emirate of Afghanistan, Eritrea and Nazi Germany.

Pejorative attributes 
Regardless of the form of government, the actual governance may be influenced by sectors with political power which are not part of the formal government. These are terms that highlight certain actions of the governors, such as corruption, demagoguery, or fear mongering that may disrupt the intended way of working of the government if they are widespread enough.

Other attributes

Forms of government by power ideology

Types of monarchy 
Countries with monarchy attributes are those where a family or group of families (rarely another type of group), called the royalty, represents national identity, with power traditionally assigned to one of its individuals, called the monarch, who mostly rule kingdoms. The actual role of the monarch and other members of royalty varies from purely symbolical (crowned republic) to partial and restricted (constitutional monarchy) to completely despotic (absolute monarchy). Traditionally and in most cases, the post of the monarch is inherited, but there are also elective monarchies where the monarch is elected.

Types of republic 
Rule by a form of government in which the people, or some significant portion of them, have supreme control over the government and where offices of state are elected or chosen by elected people. A common simplified definition of a republic is a government where the head of state is not a monarch. Montesquieu included both democracies, where all the people have a share in rule, and aristocracies or oligarchies, where only some of the people rule, as republican forms of government.

Note: These categories are not exclusive.

Forms of government by socio-economic attributes

By socio-economic attributes 

Many political systems can be described as socioeconomic ideologies. Experience with those movements in power and the strong ties they may have to particular forms of government can cause them to be considered as forms of government in themselves.

Note: These categories are not exclusive.

Types of government by geo-cultural attributes 
Governments can also be categorized based on their size and scope of influence:

Forms of government by other attributes

By significant constitutional attributes 
Certain major characteristics are defining of certain types; others are historically associated with certain types of government.
 Civilian control of the military vs. stratocracy
 Majority rule or parliamentary sovereignty vs. constitution or bill of rights with separation of powers and supermajority rules to prevent tyranny of the majority and protect minority rights
 Rule according to higher law (unwritten ethical principles) vs. written constitutionalism
 Separation of church and state or free church vs. state religion
 Totalitarianism or authoritarianism vs. libertarianism

By approach to regional autonomy 
This list focuses on differing approaches that political systems take to the distribution of sovereignty, and the autonomy of regions within the state.
 Sovereignty located exclusively at the centre of political jurisdiction
 Empire
 Sovereignty located at the centre and in peripheral areas
 Federal monarchy
 Hegemony
 Diverging degrees of sovereignty
 Alliance
 Asymmetrical federalism
 Chartered company
 Client state
 Associated state
 Dependent territory
 Protectorate
 Puppet state
 Satellite state
 Vassal state
 Colony
 Crown colony
 Commonwealth
 Corpus separatum
 Decentralisation and devolution (powers redistributed from central to regional or local governments)
 Federacy
 Mandate
 Military frontier
 Neutral zone
 Non-self-governing territories
 Occupied territory
 Provisional government
 Thalassocracy
 Unrecognized state
 Government in exile
 Micronation
 Separatist movement
 States with limited recognition

Theoretical and speculative attributes 
These have no conclusive historical or current examples outside of speculation and scholarly debate.

See also
 List of countries by system of government
 List of political ideologies
 List of political systems in France
 Project Cybersyn, a data fed group of secluded individuals in Chile in the 1970s that regulated aspects of public and private life using data feeds and technology having no interactivity with the citizens but using facts only to decide direction.
 List of territorial disputes
 Exclusive mandate

References

External links 
 The Phrontistery Word List: Types of Government and Leadership
 Types of Governments from Historical Atlas of the 20th Century
 Other classifications examples from Historical Atlas of the 20th Century
 World Affairs: Types of Government
 CBBC Newsround: types of government

Forms of government